Saraburi Stadium or Saraburi Provincial Administrative Organization Stadium, is a stadium located in Saraburi, Thailand.  It is currently used for football matches. The stadium holds 6,000 spectators.

External links
Stadium information

Football venues in Thailand
Buildings and structures in Saraburi province